Scilab is a free and open-source, cross-platform numerical computational package and a high-level, numerically oriented programming language.  It can be used for signal processing, statistical analysis, image enhancement, fluid dynamics simulations, numerical optimization, and modeling, simulation of explicit and implicit dynamical systems and (if the corresponding toolbox is installed) symbolic manipulations.

Scilab is one of the two major open-source alternatives to MATLAB, the other one being GNU Octave. Scilab puts less emphasis on syntactic compatibility with MATLAB than Octave does, but it is similar enough that some authors suggest that it is easy to transfer skills between the two systems.

Introduction

Scilab is a high-level, numerically oriented programming language. The language provides an interpreted programming environment, with matrices as the main data type. By using matrix-based computation, dynamic typing, and automatic memory management, many numerical problems may be expressed in a reduced number of code lines, as compared to similar solutions using traditional languages, such as Fortran, C, or C++. This allows users to rapidly construct models for a range of mathematical problems. While the language provides simple matrix operations such as multiplication, the Scilab package also provides a library of high-level operations such as correlation and complex multidimensional arithmetic.

Scilab also includes a free package called Xcos for modeling and simulation of explicit and implicit dynamical systems, including both continuous and discrete sub-systems. Xcos is the open source equivalent to Simulink from the MathWorks.

As the syntax of Scilab is similar to MATLAB, Scilab includes a source code translator for assisting the conversion of code from MATLAB to Scilab. Scilab is available free of cost under an open source license. Due to the open source nature of the software, some user contributions have been integrated into the main program.

Syntax 
Scilab syntax is largely based on the MATLAB language. The simplest way to execute Scilab code is to type it in at the prompt, --> , in the graphical command window. In this way, Scilab can be used as an interactive mathematical shell.

Hello World! in Scilab:
disp('Hello World');

Plotting a 3D surface function:
// A simple plot of z = f(x,y)
t=[0:0.3:2*%pi]';
z=sin(t)*cos(t');
plot3d(t,t',z)

Toolboxes 
Scilab has many contributed toolboxes for different tasks, such as
 Scilab Image Processing Toolbox (SIP) and its variants (such as SIVP)
 Scilab Wavelet Toolbox
 Scilab Java and .NET Module
 Scilab Remote Access Module

More are available on ATOMS Portal or the Scilab forge.

History 

Scilab was created in 1990 by researchers from INRIA and École nationale des ponts et chaussées (ENPC). It was initially named Ψlab (Psilab). The Scilab Consortium was formed in May 2003 to broaden contributions and promote Scilab as worldwide reference software in academia and industry. In July 2008, in order to improve the technology transfer, the Scilab Consortium joined the Digiteo Foundation.

Scilab 5.1, the first release compiled for Mac, was available in early 2009, and supported Mac OS X 10.5, a.k.a. Leopard. Thus, OSX 10.4, Tiger, was never supported except by porting from sources. Linux and Windows builds had been released since the beginning, with Solaris support dropped with version 3.1.1, and HP-UX dropped with version 4.1.2 after spotty support.

In June 2010, the Consortium announced the creation of Scilab Enterprises.  Scilab Enterprises develops and markets, directly or through an international network of affiliated services providers, a comprehensive set of services for Scilab users. Scilab Enterprises also develops and maintains the Scilab software. The ultimate goal of Scilab Enterprises is to help make the use of Scilab more effective and easy.

In February 2017 Scilab 6.0.0 was released which leveraged the latest C++ standards and lifted memory allocation limitations.

Since July 2012, Scilab is developed and published by Scilab Enterprises and in early 2017 Scilab Enterprises was acquired by Virtual Prototyping pioneer ESI Group

Since 2019 and Scilab 6.0.2, the University of Technology of Compiègne provides resources to build and maintain the macOS version.

Scilab Cloud App & Scilab Cloud API 
Since 2016 Scilab can be embedded in a browser and be called via an interface written in Scilab or an API.

This new deployment method has the notable advantages of masking code & data as well as providing large computational power.

These features have not been included in the open source version of Scilab and are still proprietary developments.

See also 
 SageMath
 List of numerical-analysis software
 Comparison of numerical-analysis software
 SimulationX

References

Further reading

External links 

 Scilab website

Array programming languages
Dassault Group
Free educational software
Free mathematics software
Free software programmed in Fortran
Numerical analysis software for Linux
Numerical analysis software for macOS
Numerical analysis software for Windows
Numerical programming languages
Science software that uses GTK